The National Order of Merit is a state order of the Republic of Malta. The order is divided into four grades that may be awarded to Maltese citizens. 

The grade of Companion of Honour of the National Order of Merit is the highest honour that the government of Malta may confer upon its citizens. Citizens of other countries may be awarded the order on an honorary basis.

Recipients 
The National Order of Merit pays tribute to Maltese citizens who distinguish themselves in different fields of endeavour. The motto of the Order is Virtute et Constantia. Only Maltese citizens are eligible to be appointed members of the Order. However, honorary membership may be conferred on foreign nationals who have distinguished themselves by their service in the promotion and fostering of international relations, or who have earned the respect and gratitude of the people of the Maltese Islands.

In addition to past and present presidents and prime ministers who are by virtue of their offices members of the National Order of Merit in the grade of Companion of Honour, there can be only three other members in this grade at any one time. In the other grades the maximum at any one time is twelve Companions, twenty Officers and one hundred Members. Annual appointments may not exceed two Companions, three Officers and ten Members, provided that in determining the number of appointees to the Order, no account shall be taken of the appointment of Honorary Members.

Grades

National appointments 
The four grades of the Order are designed to embrace a wide spectrum of achievement and service. Appointees to the National Order of Merit are entitled in terms of the law to place the following letters after their names:
 Companions of Honour – K.U.O.M. (Kumpannji tal-Unur)
 Companions – K.O.M. (Kumpannji)
 Officers – U.O.M. (Uffiċjali)
 Members – M.O.M. (Membri)

Honorary appointments 
In addition to the same rank as national appointments, two ranks have been added 
 Honorary Companions of Honour with Collar – K.U.O.M. approved by Legal Notice No. 178 of 7/12/94
 Honorary Companions of Honour – K.U.O.M.
 Honorary Companions with Breast Star – K.O.M. approved by Legal Notice No. 162 of 14/11/95 Honorary Companions – K.O.M.
 Honorary Officers – U.O.M.
 Honorary Members – M.O.M.

 Insignia 
Companions of Honour
The insignia for a Companion of Honour includes a breast star with silver rays  in diameter. Superimposed over the rays is a silver-gilt white enameled Maltese Cross  in diameter. In the center of the cross is the Coat of arms of Malta. The badge of the order is similar to the star, but only includes the Maltese Cross and the coat of arms.

Companions
The breast star for a companion is the same as that of the Companion of Honour but without the silver rays. It is a Maltese Cross  in diameter. In the center of the cross is the Coat of Arms of Malta.

Officers
When worn by a female recipient the ribbon suspending the badge is fashioned into a bow.

Members
Members wear the badge of the order in the same manner as officers. The Maltese Cross on a member's badge is silver instead of enamelled.

See also
List of Honorary Companions of Honour of the National Order of Merit

References

 External links 
 Prime Minister website: Presentation of the Order - List of National appointments - List of honorary appointments
 Malta - National Order of Merit, Queen and the Commonwealth The Royal Tour''. The Royal Collection.

Orders, decorations, and medals of Malta
Merit (Malta), National Order of